The Duke of Edinburgh's International Award is a personal achievement program available to young people in Canada. Recipients must in between the ages of 14 to 25. As of April 2021, over 500,000 young people from Canada, and 10 million youth in 143 other countries have received the award.

Concept 

The purpose of The Duke of Edinburgh's International Award is to encourage young people to set their own goals and challenges and work towards achieving them. They are recognized for persevering to reach their goals. There is no competition between the participants since it is a personal achievement programme. Self-motivation is fundamental to the framework and there are no set standards to measure achievements. The criteria for gaining an award are based on each participant's improvement and growth. Even if an award is not attained, being involved in the programme allows potential recipients to socialize and learn new things. The Award program has three levels: Bronze, Silver, and Gold. Each requires an increasing level of commitment and effort.[1]

The Award Framework is designed to encourage youth to set and achieve goals. It is a journey of self-development, self-training, and personal achievement, and is based upon individual effort and improvement. To achieve an Award, participants must set goals in multiple program areas: service, skills, physical recreation, adventurous journey, and an additional project.

History 

In 1963 the Award was launched in Canada and opened up to all young Canadians between the ages of 14 to 24. Pilot projects were launched in various cities in Nova Scotia, Ontario and British Columbia. In 1964 one of the first Award Ceremonies was held, with 48 Bronze and 6 Silver Awards presented to participants.

In 1966, the first Gold Award Ceremony was held in Ottawa. Prince Philip, Duke of Edinburgh, presented 18 recipients with their Gold Awards. By the early 1980s, the Award was operating in Quebec, Manitoba, Alberta, Saskatchewan, Newfoundland, Prince Edward Island, the Yukon, and Northwest Territories.

Once launched within the 10 provinces and 2 territories, the Award program began to find roots in Canadian soil and by 1986, British Columbia, the Yukon and Quebec had been recorded as having the highest levels of participation.

In 2018 over 42,000 young Canadians were participating in the Award. There are approximately 5 million young people in Canada between the 14 to 25 age group. Nationally the program has developed several initiatives to expand the Award so it becomes more accessible to "at-risk" youth, inner-city youth, young offenders, youth with disabilities, as well as northern and aboriginal youth.

The Award in Canada is associated with The Duke of Edinburgh's International Foundation. In 1967 Canada hosted the first International Gold Event which brought Gold Award achievers from around the world to Canada. In 1988 Canada became a founding member of The Duke of Edinburgh’s Award International Association and is currently one of the four largest National Award Authorities. In 2002, Canada hosted its second International Gold Event – Rendezvous 2002.

See also 
The Duke of Edinburgh's Award
Gaisce – The President's Award
Hong Kong Award for Young People
International Award Association
Israel youth award

References

External links 
 

Youth organizations based in Canada